Agnes, or Agneta Block (29 October 1629, Emmerich am Rhein – 20 April 1704, Amsterdam) was a Dutch Mennonite art collector and horticulturalist.  She is most remembered as the compiler of an album of flower and insect paintings.

Life
Agneta Block was the daughter of a successful Mennonite textile merchant.  She first married Hans de Wolff (1613–1670), a silk merchant, in Amsterdam in 1649, and after he died, in 1674 she remarried in Amsterdam Sijbrand de Flines (1623–1697). In Amsterdam, she lived on the Herengracht close to Joost van den Vondel, who became a regular visitor at her house. Vondel had married Mayken de Wolff, who was the sister of Agnes's first husband's father. This elderly uncle ate at her house on Fridays, and is probably one of her greatest influences.

Vijverhof

After the death of her first husband, Agneta bought a country estate on the Vecht river in Loenen, which she proceeded to decorate with a large collection of curiosities, including the gardens, which were planted with exotic plants. She enjoyed drawing and painting in water colors, and her garden lent itself to this hobby. She is registered as an artist with the Dutch Institute of Art History as a papercut artist and painter, but no works survive. To embellish her albums, she hired artists to paint for her albums. Unfortunately, her collection, and the garden have not survived, but research has revealed many of the original pages of her three albums in the albums of later collectors. 

Alida Withoos was - with her brother Pieter Withoos - one of the many artists from Hoorn who painted plants while in residence at Vijverhof. Agnes Block's stepson owned a summer house in Purmerend, near Hoorn. Other painters from Hoorn were Johannes Bronkhorst, Herman Henstenburgh, and a friend of Alida's father, Otto Marseus van Schrieck.

Painters from other cities who lived at Vijverhof and made contributions were Maria Sibylla Merian, her daughter Johanna Helena Herolts-Graff, Pieter Holsteyn II, Nicolaas Juweel (Rotterdam, 1639 - Rotterdam, 1704), Jan Moninckx, Maria Moninckx, Herman Saftleven, Rochus van Veen, Marino Benaglia Venetiano, and Nicolaes de Vree. Agnes Block was in regular correspondence with other horticulturalists such as Jan Commelin.

References

External links
Biography of Alida Withoos in 1001 Vrouwen uit de Nederlandse geschiedenis
Konstboeck Website of Wageningen university with period illustrations of plants, some of which came from Agnes Block's collection
Information over Vijverhof in Dutch
Website of the Netherlands Institute for Ecology showing an old print of Vijverhof
Print of Vijverhof showing the owner in 1710 in the website of the Utrecht archives

1629 births
1704 deaths
Botanical illustrators
Art collectors from Amsterdam
Dutch horticulturists
Dutch Mennonites
People from Emmerich am Rhein
17th-century women scientists
Mennonite artists